Pieter Willem Botha (born 24 May 1991 in Durban, South Africa) is a South African rugby union player who last played for the . His regular position is loosehead prop.

Career

Youth

In 2007, he earned his first selection at provincial level when he was chosen for the  side that played at the Under-16 Grant Khomo Week. He also represented the Griffons Country Districts side at the Under-18 Academy Week in 2008 and the Griffons' Under-18 side at the Craven Week in 2009.

In 2012, he played for the  side in the 2012 Under-21 Provincial Championship, scoring two tries in six starts in the competition.

Glendale Raptors

In 2012, he joined the United States-based side the Glendale Raptors for two seasons under head coach and former Springbok André Snyman. He featured in all the spring season games and helped them reach the National Division 1. In 2013, the Raptors got promoted to the inaugural Elite Cup where they just missed a play-off spot.

Griffons

He made the step up to the senior side in 2014. He also played off the bench in their next match against  before making his first senior start, playing the first hour of their 69–5 loss to Mpumalanga-based side  in Welkom. He started two more matches as the Griffons finished sixth in the Northern Section and failed to qualify for the semi-finals.

His Currie Cup debut came a few months later. He started one match during the competition and made a further three substitute appearances as the Griffons finished third to qualify for the 2014 Currie Cup First Division. He made an additional two substitute appearances in the First Division as the Griffons won the competition, their first trophy for six years.

References

1991 births
Living people
Griffons (rugby union) players
Rugby union players from Durban
Rugby union props
South African rugby union players